Kevin George Robertson (born February 8, 1959) is an American former water polo player, who won two Olympic silver medals during his career: in 1984 and 1988. He was affiliated with the University of California. In 1994, he was inducted into the USA Water Polo Hall of Fame.

See also
 List of Olympic medalists in water polo (men)

References

External links
 

1959 births
Living people
American male water polo players
Water polo drivers
Left-handed water polo players
Water polo players at the 1984 Summer Olympics
Water polo players at the 1988 Summer Olympics
Olympic silver medalists for the United States in water polo
Medalists at the 1984 Summer Olympics
Medalists at the 1988 Summer Olympics
Sportspeople from Biloxi, Mississippi
California Golden Bears men's water polo players